Moradabad-e Gol Gol (also Romanized as Morādābād-e Gol Gol) is a village in Mirbag-e Shomali Rural District, in the Central District of Delfan County, Lorestan Province, Iran. At the 2006 census, its population was 176, in 37 families.

References 

Towns and villages in Delfan County